Stanislao Silesu (5 July 1883 in Samassi – 1953 in Paris) was an Italian composer. His father Luigi was organist at the Cathedral of Santa Clara.

Compositions &c.

Lao Silesu, Concerto per pianoforte e Orchestra, Foglie sparse, Notturno, Preludi, Orchestra Sinfonica di Cagliari, Nino Bonavolontà, conductor; Stefano Arnaldi, Maurizio Moretti, piano, Comments by Jens-Peter Roeber, Editions Européennes (1988)

Lao Silesu, Rapsodia sarda, Muse champêtre, Marcia funebre, Lamento, Orchestra da Camera "Ennio Porrino", Giacomo Medas, conductor, Comments by Jens-Peter Roeber, Editions Européennes (1989) He is buried at the Cimetière parisien de Pantin.

Francesco Boneschi La terza pagina italiana 1966 p178 "Rievocazione del musicista sardo Lao Silesu, nato a Samussi, nel cagliaritano, nel 1883, e morto a Parigi nel 1953, dove riposa nel cimitero di Pantin. L'articolista sottolinea i suoi esordi prodigiosi: a cinque anni, sotto la guida del padre, organista nella Cattedrale Santa Chiara di Iglesias, suonava il pianoforte; a dieci eseguì il suo primo concerto con musiche di Liszt e Bellini; a tredici ..."

Raimondo Bonu Scrittori sardi dal 1746 al 1950 1952 p133 "più tardi, Lao Silesu per la vasta e apprezzata composizione, nella melopea presenterà Gavino Gabriel, per vari drammi ... Il terzo dei sei figli di Luigi fu Stanislao (in arte Lao), che dalla borgata di Samassi (vi era nato il 5 luglio 1883) fu ..."

1883 births
1953 deaths
People from the Province of South Sardinia
Italian male composers
20th-century Italian composers
20th-century Italian male musicians